Salalah Sports Complex also known as The Youth Complex, is a government owned multi-purpose stadium in the Auwqad district of Salalah, Oman.  It is currently used mostly for football matches, and also has facilities for athletics. It  the home stadium of the Dhofar Football Club, as well as counterparts Al-Nasr Salalah. Home matches are also played there for first division team Al-Hilal.

Salalah Sports Complex and the Saadah Stadium
After the recent construction and completion of the Al-Saadah Stadium in the Al-Saadah district of Salalah, many of the matches of clubs Al-Nasr and Dhofar have been played there.  There is also much confusion between the 2 venues when referring to the home stadium to be played by a team from Salalah, even when reported by the newspapers or the official websites of the clubs!

External links 
Proposed Plan for the Complex

Football venues in Oman
Sports venues in Oman
Athletics (track and field) venues in Oman
Multi-purpose stadiums in Oman